Matthew Cameron Smith (born 5 October 1996 in Scotland) is a Scottish rugby union player who plays for Glasgow High Kelvinside. He previously played for Glasgow Warriors and Edinburgh Rugby at the Flanker position.

Rugby Union career

Amateur career

Smith was part of the Stirling County youth set-up. He won man of the match in the National Youth League Cup final when Stirling Country won the tournament in 2013. They had previously won the same tournament in 2011 and 2012.

In 2015-16 season, Smith moved to play for Glasgow Hawks. Smith has been drafted to Glasgow Hawks in the Scottish Premiership for the 2017-18 season.

In 2021, Smith played for Glasgow High Kelvinside.

Professional career

The flanker secured an Elite Development Programme place with Glasgow Warriors for the 2014–15 season. This meant he could continue playing for Stirling County  whilst training with the Warriors.

The following season he was named as a Scottish Rugby Academy Stage 3 player. Stage 3 players are assigned to a professional team; and once again Smith was assigned to Glasgow Warriors for 2015-16.

In 2016-17 season Smith once again was classed as a Warriors player. He was promoted out the academy on 19 December 2016 by Glasgow Warriors earning a contract for a year and a half.

On 7 February 2020 Smith was loaned to Edinburgh Rugby for the remainder of the season.

In June 2020, following a period of reflection during the suspension of rugby during the COVID-19 pandemic, Matt took the decision to retire from playing professional rugby. He announced the decision on Twitter.

International career

Smith was capped by Scotland U20s against France in 2015. He was called up to Scotland's squad for the 2019 Six Nations Championship.

Family

His sister, Hannah, has played representative rugby for Scotland. His great grandfather, Alex Smith, played association football for Rangers and Dunfermline Athletic.

External links 
 Scottish Rugby biography
 Glasgow Warriors biography

References 

1996 births
Living people
Scottish rugby union players
Glasgow Warriors players
Glasgow Hawks players
Stirling County RFC players
Edinburgh Rugby players
Glasgow High Kelvinside RFC players
Rugby union flankers